Peter Zeindler (born 1934) is a Swiss journalist, crime fiction writer, and playwright. He was born in Zürich.

His play Der Eremit was first staged at the Stadttheater in Bern in 1966. The play Kurzschluss was first staged at the Badisches Staatstheater Karlsruhe in 1969. The comedy Der Kurgast was staged at Theater am Hechtplatz in Zürich in 1985.

Among his crime novels are Tarock from 1982, Die Ringe des Saturns from 1984, Der Zirkel from 1985, and Das Sargbukett from 1992. In 2009, he published the book Die Meisterpartie, a collection of criminal short stories.

He was awarded the Deutscher Krimi Preis four times, in 1986, 1988, 1990 and 1992. Among other awards is the Honorary Award from the city of Zürich in 1995.

References 

1934 births
Living people
Writers from Zürich
Swiss male novelists
Swiss dramatists and playwrights
Male dramatists and playwrights
Swiss journalists
20th-century Swiss novelists
21st-century Swiss novelists
20th-century male writers
21st-century male writers